The 5th IAAF World Indoor Championships in Athletics were held at the Palau Sant Jordi in Barcelona, Catalonia, Spain from 10 March to 12 March 1995. Almost 600 athletes from 131 nations participated in 27 events.

Results

Men

Women

 Larisa Peleshenko (RUS) originally won the shot put and was awarded the gold medal, but was later disqualified for doping.
 Lyubov Kremlyova (RUS) originally came third in the 1500 metre and was awarded the bronze medal, but was later disqualified for doping.
 Violeta Beclea (ROU) originally came 4th in the 1500 metre, and seemed to be in line of an upgrade to bronze medalist after Kremlyova's disqualification, but she too was disqualified for doping.

Medal table

Participating nations

 (1)
 (2)
 (1)
 (2)
 (2)
 (4)
 (1)
 (8)
 (8)
 (3)
 (2)
 (1)
 (5)
 (6)
 (1)
 (2)
 (2)
 (1)
 (2)
 (10)
 (1)
 (2)
 (9)
 (1)
 (1)
 (1)
 (12)
 (2)
 (3)
 (2)
 (11)
 (3)
 (15)
 (2)
 (1)
 (1)
 (3)
 (1)
 (1)
 (6)
 (21)
 (1)
 (1)
 (1)
 (31)
 (1)
 (30)
 (14)
 (1)
 (1)
 (1)
 (1)
 (4)
 (2)
 (1)
 (6)
 (1)
 (18)
 (2)
 (9)
 (6)
 (9)
 (2)
 (1)
 (2)
 (1)
 (2)
 (2)
 (1)
 (1)
 (1)
 (1)
 (1)
 (1)
 (2)
 (1)
 (7)
 (2)
 (9)
 (1)
 (2)
 (1)
 (1)
 (2)
 (11)
 (1)
 (1)
 (1)
 (1)
 (1)
 (1)
 (1)
 (3)
 (9)
 (1)
 (3)
 (1)
 (15)
 (34)
 (1)
 (2)
 (1)
 (1)
 (2)
 (2)
 (2)
 (2)
 (10)
 (2)
 (2)
 (28)
 (1)
 (2)
 (16)
 (5)
 (1)
 (1)
 (1)
 (2)
 (2)
 (2)
 (1)
 (1)
 (11)
 (52)
 (1)
 (1)
 (2)
 (1)
 (3)
 (1)

See also
 1995 in athletics (track and field)

References

External links
1995 IAAF World Indoor Championships (archived)

 
World Indoor Championships
IAAF World Indoor Championships
World Athletics Indoor Championships
Athletics
A
International athletics competitions hosted by Spain
Athletics competitions in Catalonia
Ath
1990s in Barcelona
IAAF World Indoor Championships
Athletics in Barcelona